Przymorze is one of the quarters of the city of Gdańsk. It is divided into 2 quarters:
 Przymorze Małe      
 Przymorze Wielkie
inhabitants: 54,277
area: 5.6

External links 

Districts of Gdańsk